Conditum, piperatum, or konditon (κόνδιτον) is a family of spiced wines in ancient Roman and Byzantine cuisine.

The Latin name translates roughly as "spiced". Recipes for conditum viatorium (traveler's spiced wine) and conditum paradoxum (surprise spiced wine) are found in De re coquinaria. This conditum paradoxum includes wine, honey, pepper, mastic, laurel, saffron, date seeds and dates soaked in wine.

In the Levant of the 4th-century CE, the main ingredients of conditum were wine, honey and pepper corns. Conditum was considered to be a piquant wine.

A 10th-century redaction of an earlier Greek Byzantine agricultural work brings down the relative portions of each ingredient:
Let eight scruples of pepper [corns] washed and dried and carefully pounded; one sextarius of Attic honey, and four or five sextarii of old white wine, be mixed.

References

Bibliography
 Andrew Dalby, Food in the Ancient World from A to Z, 2003 

Ancient wine
Historical drinks
Roman cuisine
Byzantine cuisine